Charles Kilgore Smith (February 15, 1799 – September 28, 1866) was an American politician, lawyer, and first secretary of Minnesota Territory.

Born in Cincinnati, Ohio, he moved with his family to Hamilton, Ohio. Smith worked in the banking business and practiced law. Smith served as assistant county judge of Hamilton County. He was appointed the first secretary of Minnesota Territory serving 1849–1851. He also founded the Minnesota Historical Society. He then moved back to Hamilton, Ohio to practice law until his death.

Notes

1799 births
1866 deaths
Politicians from Cincinnati
Politicians from Hamilton, Ohio
Ohio lawyers
Ohio state court judges
Minnesota Territory officials
Lawyers from Cincinnati
19th-century American judges
19th-century American lawyers